Thomas Ross (born 1 September 1927) was a British speed skater. He competed in two events at the 1948 Winter Olympics.

References

External links
 

1927 births
Possibly living people
British male speed skaters
Olympic speed skaters of Great Britain
Speed skaters at the 1948 Winter Olympics
Sportspeople from Glasgow